USS Tuscaloosa has been the name of two ships of the United States Navy. Both are named for the city of Tuscaloosa, Alabama.

, a  heavy cruiser, which served from 1934 until 1946.

United States Navy ship names